Aleksandr Yurievich Alekseyev (born 8 January 1968) is a Belarusian ice hockey player. He competed in the men's tournament at the 1998 Winter Olympics.

Career statistics

Regular season and playoffs

International

References

External links
 

1968 births
Living people
Soviet ice hockey players
Olympic ice hockey players of Belarus
Ice hockey players at the 1998 Winter Olympics
Sportspeople from Ufa
Khimik-SKA Novopolotsk players
HK Neman Grodno players
HC Dinamo Minsk players
Podhale Nowy Targ players
HC Vityaz players
Salavat Yulaev Ufa players